Nikola Jozić (Serbian Cyrillic: Никола Јозић; born 29 September 1982) is a German-born Serbian retired football defender.

Career
After playing with several clubs in Germany, in January 2001 he moved from Eintracht Frankfurt to French Ligue 1 club Auxerre which would be his first senior experience. After a successful two and a half seasons there, he moved to Serbia to play with FK Železnik where he will win a 2005 Serbia and Montenegro Cup.

He also holds German citizenship making his football debut at Eintracht Frankfurt. The 1.94 m defender also played at Auxerre and Gaziantepspor.

Position
Nikola was a versatile footballer, he played in the defence as central, left back, right back, central for the back four or central Midfield.

International
Jozić played with his homeland FR Yugoslavia at the 2001 UEFA European Under-18 Championship in Finland. He played 6 games for the under 18.

Honours
2005: Serbia and Montenegro Cup
2003: Coupe de France

External links
 
 

Living people
1982 births
Serbian footballers
Serbian expatriate footballers
FSV Oggersheim players
SV Waldhof Mannheim players
Eintracht Frankfurt II players
FK Železnik players
Gaziantepspor footballers
Expatriate footballers in Turkey
Expatriate footballers in Bosnia and Herzegovina
AJ Auxerre players
Ligue 1 players
Expatriate footballers in France
FC Gloria Buzău players
Liga I players
Expatriate footballers in Romania
Bosnia and Herzegovina expatriate sportspeople in Romania
Association football defenders
Sportspeople from Ludwigshafen